Inga spectabilis is a species of plant in the family Fabaceae.

It is native to Central America and the Andean states to Bolivia. The blade-like morphology of the fruiting pod has earned it the common name machete ice-cream-bean (Guamo Macheto, Guaba Machete).

References

spectabilis
Flora of Colombia
Flora of Bolivia
Flora of Mexico
Taxa named by Carl Ludwig Willdenow